Abagaytuy is a rural locality (a selo) in Abagaytuyskoye Rural Settlement of Zabaykalsky District, Russia. The  population was 510 as of 2017.

Geography 
Abagaytuy is located on the left bank of the Argun River, 45 km east of Zabaykalsk (the district's administrative centre) by road.  is the nearest rural locality.

History 
Abagaytuy is based in 1728.

References 

Rural localities in Zabaykalsky Krai